Réunion elects on regional/départemental level a legislature. The legislature consists out of two councils with diverging powers. The Regional Council (Conseil régional) has 45 members, elected for a six-year term by proportional representation. The General Council (Conseil général) has members elected for a five-year term in single seat-constituencies. 
Reunion has a multi-party system, with numerous parties in which no one party often has a chance of gaining power alone, and parties must work with each other to form coalition governments.

Recent elections

See also
Electoral calendar
Electoral system